Abronia meledona is an endangered species of arboreal alligator lizard described in 1999 by Campbell and Brodie from Guatemala.

References

Abronia
Reptiles of Guatemala
Endemic fauna of Guatemala
Reptiles described in 1999
Taxa named by Jonathan A. Campbell